Andrés Sancho (born 4 July 1961) is a Costa Rican judoka. He competed in the men's half-lightweight event at the 1984 Summer Olympics.

References

1961 births
Living people
Costa Rican male judoka
Olympic judoka of Costa Rica
Judoka at the 1984 Summer Olympics
Place of birth missing (living people)